Anthony Idiata (born January 5, 1975) is a Nigerian high jumper.

He holds the African indoor record in high jump with 2.32 metres, achieved in February 2000 in Patras.

Achievements 
1999 All-Africa Games - gold medal - 2.27 metres, personal best
1997 West African Championships - gold medal
1996 African Championships - silver medal
1995 All-Africa Games - silver medal

References

External links

1975 births
Living people
Nigerian male high jumpers
African Games gold medalists for Nigeria
African Games medalists in athletics (track and field)
African Games silver medalists for Nigeria
Athletes (track and field) at the 1995 All-Africa Games
Athletes (track and field) at the 1999 All-Africa Games
20th-century Nigerian people
21st-century Nigerian people